The 2010 Prosperita Open was a professional tennis tournament played on red clay courts. It was part of the 2010 ATP Challenger Tour. It took place in Ostrava, Czech Republic between April 26 and May 2, 2010.

ATP entrants

Seeds

 Rankings are as of April 19, 2010.

Other entrants
The following players received wildcards into the singles main draw:
  Mario Ančić
  Grzegorz Panfil
  Martin Přikryl
  Jiří Veselý

The following players received entry from the qualifying draw:
  Filip Krajinović
  Jan Mertl
  Dawid Olejniczak
  Pavel Šnobel

Champions

Singles

 Lukáš Rosol def.  Ivan Dodig, 7–5, 4–6, 7–6(4)

Doubles

 Martin Fischer /  Philipp Oswald vs  Tomasz Bednarek /  Mateusz Kowalczyk, 2–6, 7–6(6), [10–8]

External links
Official website
ITF search 

Prosperita Open
Prosperita Open
Prosperita Open
Prosperita Open
Prosperita Open